Arthur Wittwer (15 November 1927 – 26 November 2008) was a Swiss long-distance runner. He competed in the marathon at the 1960 Summer Olympics.

References

External links
 

1927 births
2008 deaths
Athletes (track and field) at the 1960 Summer Olympics
Swiss male long-distance runners
Swiss male marathon runners
Olympic athletes of Switzerland
Sportspeople from St. Gallen (city)